Soulskinner is the sixth studio album by the German death metal band Fleshcrawl. The last to feature founding guitarist Stefan Hanus.

Track listing 

 "Soulskinner" – 3:48
 "Dying Blood" – 6:32
 "Carved in Flesh" – 4:27
 "Breeding the Dead" – 3:09
 "The Forthcoming End" – 5:17
 "Deathvastation" – 4:02
 "Legions of Hatred" – 4:04
 "Forced to Kill" – 3:56
 "Rotten" – 4:43
 "Metal Gods" (Judas Priest cover) – 3:33

Line up 

 Sven Gross – vocals
 Tobias Schick – bass
 Stefan Hanus – guitar
 Mike Hanus – guitar
 Bastian Herzog – drums

Production 
 Produced by Fleshcrawl
 Recorded and mixed at Studio Underground, Västerås, Sweden, 17 September – 2 October 2001
 Engineered by Pelle Saether and Lars Linden
 Mixed by Pelle Saether & Fleshcrawl
 Mastered by Achim Köhler at Indiscreet-Audio, Hohengehren, Germany.
 All music and lyrics by Fleshcrawl, except "Metal Gods", originally by Judas Priest (Glenn Tipton / Rob Halford / K.K. Downing)
 Cover artwork by Uwe Jarling. Photo by Thomas Kärcher
 Live pics by Kerstin Rössler & Andreas Vogt
 Layout by Stefan & Mike Hanus. Graphic work by Stefan Hanus

2002 albums
Fleshcrawl albums